There were three events in World War II called Operation Adler (Adler means Eagle in German):

 A series of Luftwaffe attacks beginning on 13 August 1940 known as Operation Eagle Attack (Unternehmen Adlerangriff) set to begin on Adlertag ("Eagle Day"). 
 An anti-partisan operation centered on the Chechivichi region of Belarus, begun on 20 July 1942.
 An anti-partisan operation by German and Croatian units on the north Dalmatian coast, between Karlobag and Zadar in November 1943.

World War II operations and battles of Europe
Military operations of World War II involving Germany
Anti-partisan operations of World War II